Estelle Girda Beere  (23 July 1875 – 20 September 1959) was a New Zealand dancing teacher. She was born in Wanganui, New Zealand, on 23 July 1875.

In the 1958 Queen's Birthday Honours, Beere was appointed an Officer of the Order of the British Empire, for services as a teacher of dancing over many years.

References

1875 births
1959 deaths
New Zealand dance teachers
People from Whanganui
New Zealand Officers of the Order of the British Empire